Peter Robert Corris (8 May 1942 – 30 August 2018) was an Australian academic, historian, journalist and a novelist of historical and crime fiction. As crime fiction writer, he was described as "the Godfather of contemporary Australian crime-writing", particularly for his Cliff Hardy novels.

Biography
Corris' secondary school education was at Melbourne High School. He was a Bachelor level student at the University of Melbourne, then gained a Master of Arts in history at Monash University. He studied at the Australian National University where he was awarded a PhD in history on the topic of the South Seas Islander slave trade (Kanakas). He continued these studies as a university lecturer, but later became a journalist, and then a full-time writer.

He was married to writer Jean Bedford.

Peter Corris wrote a book that provided deep insights into his life living with type-1 diabetes. Some of his novels have diabetic subplots. In January 2017, Corris announced that he would no longer be writing novels owing to 'creeping blindness' because of his diabetes.

Awards and achievements
Ned Kelly Awards for Crime Writing, Lifetime Achievement, 1999: winner
Ned Kelly Awards for Crime Writing, Best Fiction, 2004: nominated for Master's Mates
Ned Kelly Awards for Crime Writing, Best Fiction, 2006: shortlisted for Saving Billie
Ned Kelly Awards for Crime Writing, Best Fiction, 2007: shortlisted for The Undertow
Ned Kelly Awards for Crime Writing, Best Fiction, 2008: nominated for Appeal Denied
Ned Kelly Awards for Crime Writing, Best Fiction, 2008: nominated for Open File
Ned Kelly Awards for Crime Writing, Best Fiction, 2009: winner for Deep Water

Partial list of books

Cliff Hardy novels
 The Dying Trade (Sydney, McGraw-Hill, 1980);  
 White Meat (Sydney, Pan Books, 1981); 
 The Marvellous Boy (Sydney, Pan Books, 1982); 
 The Empty Beach (Sydney, Allen & Unwin, 1983); 
 Heroin Annie and Other Cliff Hardy Stories (Sydney, Allen & Unwin, 1984); 
 Make Me Rich (Sydney, Allen & Unwin, 1985); 
 The Big Drop and Other Cliff Hardy Stories (Sydney, Allen & Unwin, 1985); 
 The Greenwich Apartments (Sydney, Allen & Unwin, 1986); 
 Deal Me Out (Sydney, Allen & Unwin, 1986); 
 The January Zone (Sydney, Allen & Unwin, 1987); 
 Man in the Shadows: A Short Novel and Six Stories (Sydney, Allen & Unwin, 1988); 
 O'Fear (Sydney, Bantam, 1990); 
 Wet Graves (Sydney, Bantam, 1991); 
 Aftershock (Sydney, Bantam, 1991); 
 Beware of the Dog (Sydney, Bantam, 1992); 
 Burn and Other Stories (Sydney, Bantam, 1993); 
 Matrimonial Causes (Sydney, Bantam, 1993); 
 Casino (Sydney, Bantam, 1994); 
 The Washington Club (Sydney, Bantam, 1997); 
 Forget Me If You Can: Cliff Hardy Stories (Sydney, Bantam, 1997); 
 The Reward (Sydney, Bantam, 1997); 
 The Black Prince (Sydney, Bantam, 1998); 
 The Other Side of Sorrow (Sydney, Bantam, 1999); 
 Lugarno (Sydney, Bantam, 2001); 
 Salt and Blood (Sydney, Bantam, 2002); 
 Master's Mates (Sydney, Allen & Unwin, 2003); 
 The Coast Road (Sydney, Allen & Unwin, 2004); 
 Taking Care of Business: Cliff Hardy Cases (Sydney, Allen & Unwin, 2004); 
 Saving Billie (Sydney, Allen & Unwin, 2005); 
 The Undertow (Sydney, Allen & Unwin, 2006); 
 Appeal Denied (Sydney, Allen & Unwin, 2007); 
 The Big Score: Cliff Hardy Cases (Sydney, Allen & Unwin, 2007); 
 Open File (Sydney, Allen & Unwin, 2008); 
 Deep Water (Sydney, Allen & Unwin, 2009); 
 Torn Apart (Sydney, Allen & Unwin, 2010); 
 Follow the Money (Sydney, Allen & Unwin, 2011); 
 Comeback (Sydney, Allen & Unwin, 2012); 
 The Dunbar Case (Sydney, Allen & Unwin, 2013); 
 Silent Kill (Sydney, Allen & Unwin, 2014); 
 Gun Control (Sydney, Allen & Unwin, 2015); 
 That Empty Feeling (Sydney, Allen & Unwin, 2016); 
 Win, Lose or Draw (Sydney, Allen & Unwin, 2017);

Ray Crawley novels
 Pokerface (Melbourne, Penguin, 1985); 
 The Baltic Business (Melbourne, Penguin, 1988); 
 The Kimberly Killing (Melbourne, Penguin, 1988); 
 The Cargo Club (Melbourne, Penguin, 1990); 
 The Azanian Action (Sydney, Angus & Robertson, 1991); 
 The Japanese Job (Sydney, Angus & Robertson, 1992); 
 The Time Trap (Sydney, HarperCollins, 1994); 
 The Vietnam Volunteer (Lismore, NSW, Southern Cross University Press, 2000);

Richard Browning novels
 Box Office Browning (Melbourne, Viking, 1987); 
 Beverly Hills Browning (Melbourne, Penguin, 1987); 
 Browning Takes Off (Melbourne, Penguin, 1989); 
 Browning in Buckskin (Melbourne, Penguin, 1991); 
 Browning P.I. (Sydney, Angus & Robertson, 1992); 
 Browning Battles On (Sydney, Angus & Robertson, 1993); 
 Browning Sahib (Sydney, HarperCollins, 1994); 
 Browning Without a Cause (Sydney, ETT Imprint, 1995);

Luke Dunlop novels
 Set Up (Sydney, Pan Macmillan, 1992); 
 Cross Off (Sydney, Pan Macmillan, 1993); 
 Get Even (Sydney, Pan Macmillan, 1994);

Other works
 Passage, Port and Plantation: A History of Solomon Islands Labour Migration, 1870-1914 (Melbourne, Melbourne University Press, 1973); 
 Lords of the Ring (Sydney, Cassell Australia, 1980); 
 Lightning Meets the West Wind: The Malaita Massacre, by Roger M. Keesing & Peter Corris (Melbourne, Oxford University Press, 1980);  
 The National Times Australian Book of Quizzes, by Jean Bedford & Peter Corris (Sydney, Allen & Unwin, 1983); 
 The Winning Side (Sydney, Allen & Unwin, 1984); 
 The Australian Family Quiz Book (Sydney, Angus & Robertson, 1985); 
 The Gulliver Fortune (Sydney, Bantam Books, 1989); 
 Naismith's Dominion (Sydney, Bantam Books, 1990); 
 Fred Hollows: An Autobiography, by Fred Hollows with Peter Corris (Melbourne, John Kerr, 1991); 
 The Brothers Craft (Sydney, Bantam Books, 1992); 
 Fighting for Fraser Island: A Man and an Island, by John Sinclair with Peter Corris (Sydney, Kerr Publishing, 1994); 
 Wimmera Gold (Sydney, Bantam Books, 1994); 
 A Round of Golf: 18 Holes with Peter Corris (Sydney, Allen & Unwin, 1998); 
 Petro-Pirates: The Hijacking of the Petro Ranger, by Ken Blyth with Peter Corris (Sydney, Allen & Unwin, 2000); 
 Sweet & Sour: A Diabetic Life (Lismore, NSW, Southern Cross University Press, 2000); 
 The Journal of Fletcher Christian: Together with the History of Henry Corkill (Sydney, Random House Australia, 2005); 
 Blood Brothers (Sydney, Lothian Books, 2007; 
 Wishart's Quest (Melbourne, Arcadia, 2009); 
 The Colonial Queen (Melbourne, Arcadia, 2011); 
 Mad Dog: William Cyril Moxley and the Moorebank Killings (Sydney, University of New South Wales Press, 2011); 
 Standing in the Shadow: Three Novellas (Melbourne, Arcadia, 2013); 
 Damned If I Do, by Philip Nitschke with Peter Corris (Melbourne, Melbourne University Press, 2013);

Edited
 The Picador Book of Golf, edited by Peter Corris & Jamie Grant (Sydney, Picador, 1995); 
 Ringside: A Knockout Collection of Fights & Fighters: The Winners, the Losers, the Legends, edited by Peter Corris & Barry Parish (Sydney, Random House Australia, 1996); 
 Menace in the Mulga (Brisbane, Crime Writers Queensland, 2000); 
 Heart Matters: Personal Stories About That Heart-Stopping Moment, edited by Peter Corris & Michael Wilding (Melbourne, Viking, 2010); 
 Best on Ground: Great Writers on the Greatest Game, edited by Peter Corris & John Dale (Melbourne, Viking, 2010);

See also
 William R. Bell
 Malaita massacre
 List of fictional private investigators
 Jimmy Sharman
 Jim Sharman

References

External links
 The Peter Corris website
 Corris and Langmores' biography of Jimmy Sharman (1887–1965)
 Peter Corris plaque in the "Writers Walk", Circular Quay, Sydney, Australia.

1942 births
2018 deaths
20th-century Australian novelists
21st-century Australian novelists
Australian mystery writers
Australian journalists
Australian male novelists
Australian crime fiction writers
University of Melbourne alumni
Ned Kelly Award winners
People from Stawell, Victoria
Writers from Victoria (Australia)
20th-century Australian male writers
21st-century Australian male writers